Kamamohitham is a 1994 Malayalam language novel by C.V. Balakrishnan. The novel narrates the story of Jajali, the monk and Sagaradathan in ancient India. Veteran director K. G. George had planned a film adaptation of the novel with Mammootty and Mohanlal in the lead roles, but the film did not take off. Another film adaptation of the novel was announced in 2015, directed by Harihardas and starring Mohanlal in a double role.

References

Malayalam-language books
Malayalam novels
1994 novels